Daniel Saldaña París (born 1984) is a Mexican poet and novelist. He gained acclaim for his debut novel En medio de extrañas víctimas and its follow-up El nervio principal (published in English by Charco Press). He has also published volumes of poetry. In 2015, he was included in the anthology México20: New Voices, Old Traditions (Pushkin Press), celebrating the best young Mexican writers. In 2017, he was chosen as one of the Bogotá39, a selection of the best young Latin American writers under forty.

References

Mexican writers
1984 births
Living people